The Battle of Mexico City is the second video release by American rock band Rage Against the Machine. The concert was recorded in Mexico City's MX Palacio de los Deportes in 1999 as part of their The Battle of Los Angeles Tour. The city was chosen as the band had been longtime supporters of various political causes in Mexico (it was also the first time they had played there).

The VHS was released in 2001 and later released on DVD in 2002, including a one-on-one interview with Noam Chomsky and a message from Subcomandante Marcos.

On June 12th 2021, it was released on vinyl as a Record Store Day exclusive.

DVD track listing
 Program start – 0:25
 "Testify" – 4:00
 "Guerrilla Radio" – 3:30
 Documentary part I – 1:48
 "People of the Sun" – 2:28
 Documentary part II – 0:39
 "Calm Like a Bomb" – 4:41
 Documentary part III – 1:02
 "Sleep Now in the Fire" – 3:33
 "Born of a Broken Man" – 4:30
 "Bombtrack" – 4:03
 "Know Your Enemy" – 4:54
 Documentary part IV – 1:00
 "No Shelter" – 3:56
 "War Within a Breath" – 3:27
 Documentary part V – 2:14
 "Bulls on Parade" – 3:55
 "Killing in the Name" – 5:10
 "Zapata's Blood" – 3:20
 "Freedom" – 8:42
 "Outro" – 1:10

"Bullet in the Head" was also performed, but was removed from the official release due to a mistake made by Tom Morello during his solo.

Bonus

 "Interview with Noam Chomsky" – 11:41
 "Interview with Marcos" – 9:25
 "Pre-Show Segment" – 3:08
 "Tom Morello's Tour of Mexico City" – 1:53

Rage Against the Machine video albums
2001 video albums
Rage Against the Machine live albums
Live video albums
2001 live albums